Tanum Municipality (Tanums kommun) is a municipality in Västra Götaland County in southwestern Sweden. Its seat is the town of Tanumshede, with 1,600 inhabitants.

The present municipality was formed in 1971 through the amalgamation of three former units. Before the subdivision reform of 1952, there were seven entities in the area.

Etymology
The parish is named after the old farm Tanum (Norse Túnheimr), since the first church was built there. The first element is tún 'country courtyard', the last element is heimr 'homestead, farm'.

Towns 
 Grebbestad
 Fjällbacka
 Hamburgsund
 Kämpersvik
 Rabbalshede
 Tanumshede

Sights

The rock carvings at Tanum have been declared a UNESCO World Heritage Site. The heritage area is located around the seat of Tanumshede, covering an area of 18 km2.

Most carvings show men and ships. Several show animals such as oxen and horses.

Tanum Municipality has made its rock carving the subject of its coat of arms.

The Greby grave field, the largest grave field in Bohuslän, lies near the locality of Grebbestad.

Tanum is one of the first municipalities to require urine separation toilets to help combat the looming global shortage of phosphorus.

References

External links

Tanum Municipality - Official site
Tanums Hällristningsmuseum Underslös - Underslös Museum and Rock Art Research Centre

Municipalities of Västra Götaland County
Gothenburg and Bohus
Rock art in Europe
Nordic Stone Age